Hippocephala guangdongensis is a species of beetle in the family Cerambycidae. It was described by Hua in 1991.

References

Agapanthiini
Beetles described in 1991